Trapania velox is a species of sea slug, a dorid nudibranch, a marine gastropod mollusc in the family Goniodorididae.

Distribution
This species was described from La Jolla, California. It has since been reported from California south to Bahia Tortugas, Baja California, Mexico.

Description
This goniodorid nudibranch is translucent white in colour, with a pattern dark brown lines forming a loose network on the body. The tips of the rhinophores, oral tentacles, gills, tail and lateral papillae are tipped with yellow.

Ecology
Trapania velox probably feeds on Entoprocta which often grow on sponges and other living substrata.

References

Goniodorididae
Gastropods described in 1901